The Morbid Anatomy Museum was a non-profit exhibition space founded in 2014 by Joanna Ebenstein, Tracy Hurley Martin, Colin Dickey, Tonya Hurley, and Aaron Beebe in the Gowanus neighborhood of Brooklyn, New York City. The museum was an expansion of Ebenstein's long-running project, the Morbid Anatomy Blog and Library and drew heavily on her experiences with the also defunct art groups Observatory and Proteus Gowanus, as well as Beebe's work in the Coney Island Museum and Dickey's interest in the arcane and the esoteric. The museum building had a lecture and event space, a cafe and a store. The museum's closing was announced on December 18, 2016.

The Museum was conceived, organized and planned by Joanna Ebenstein, Tracy Hurley Martin, Colin Dickey, and Aaron Beebe and located at 424a Third Avenue in Brooklyn, a former nightclub building the interior of which was re-modeled by architects Robert Kirkbride and Tony Cohn in 2014. In Ebenstein's words, the new space was designed to give a home for a "regular lecture series and DIY intellectual salon that brings together artists, writers, curators and passionate amateurs dedicated to what  sums up as 'the things that fall through the cracks.

The space focused on forgotten or neglected histories through exhibitions, education and public programming. Themes included nature, death and society, anatomy, medicine, arcane media, and curiosity and curiosities broadly considered. The artifacts featured in its rotating exhibitions were drawn from private collections and museums' storage spaces.

See also
Cabinet of curiosities
Dime museum

References

External links

Morbid Anatomy Website
Co-Founder Joanna Ebenstein's website

2014 establishments in New York City
2016 disestablishments in New York (state)
Defunct museums in New York City
Gowanus, Brooklyn
Museums established in 2014
Museums in Brooklyn
Natural history museums in New York (state)